During the 2019–20 season, FC Emmen participated in the Eredivisie and the KNVB Cup. Due to the COVID-19 pandemic, the Eredivisie season was abandoned with FC Emmen in 12th place. They were knocked out in the first round of the KNVB Cup, losing in the first round at NAC Breda.

Competitions

Eredivisie

League table

KNVB Cup

Player Transfers

Players In

Players Out

References

FC Emmen
FC Emmen seasons